The International Journal of Applied Earth Observation and Geoinformation is an academic journal published by Elsevier about remote sensing and geographic information.
Its editor-in-chief is F. Van der Meer and its 2019 impact factor is 4.650.

References

Geography journals
Remote sensing journals
Elsevier academic journals
Geographic information science